Diademosa is a genus of fungi in the family Diademaceae.

References

External links
Index Fungorum

Pleosporales